Football Club Dilettantistico Altovicentino was an Italian football club based in Marano Vicentino and Valdagno, Veneto. It played in Italy's Serie D.

History

Foundation
The club was founded in 2014 after the merger between the clubs of  Serie D: S.S.D. Calcio Marano and A.C.D. Trissino-Valdagno.

Colors and badge
The team's colors are red, light blue white and black.

References

Football clubs in Italy
Association football clubs established in 2014
Football clubs in Veneto
2014 establishments in Italy